Joseph Randall Biggs (born 19831984), is an American who is a leading figure in the Proud Boys group. In March 2021, a federal grand jury indicted Biggs for conspiracy in connection with the 2021 United States Capitol attack. He was subsequently indicted on seditious conspiracy charges in June 2022, along with four other Proud Boy leaders, for his alleged role in that attack.

Career
Biggs has described himself as a U.S. Army veteran who was born in Charlotte, North Carolina, and was raised there.

Activism and broadcasting 
Biggs is a far-right online personality. He is also a leading figure and organizer of the Proud Boys, an extremist group with nationalist, neofascist, and self-proclaimed "Western-chauvinist" views.

From at least 2012 through 2016, Biggs posted violent, misogynistic, and sexually violent content on Twitter. In 2017, Media Matters for America reported that Biggs had made comments on social media promoting "date rape and sexual violence". He had advocated using chloroform and roofies to have non-consensual sex with women. According to the staff writers, he threatened a past partner with revenge porn and threatened violence against transgender people (posting, "Punch a tranny"). Biggs issued a statement to Raw Story describing his personal problems following his Army discharge: "I became very depressed and turned to alcohol and the over abuse of painkillers that had been prescribed to me while I was in." Biggs said that he was suicidal at that time, and "decided to cry out for help," admitting that "I would say outlandish things on Twitter in hopes someone shocked would say 'Hey, what the hell is wrong with you?'" 

In January 2017, Biggs announced that he was doing a pilot show for Right Side Broadcasting Network (RSBN), a pro-Trump online channel. The show was to be dedicated to guns and the Second Amendment, and the pilot episode was posted online. The online TV show was not produced following the pilot, following the reporting on Biggs' history of pro-violence comments on social media. RSBN's CEO Joe Seales told Media Matters that Biggs "never worked for or with us. We worked up the idea of a pilot for a show, which included him, but it wasn't meant to be."

Biggs is an organizer for the Proud Boys and a former InfoWars staff member, where he was an "on-camera personality". Biggs also hosted a show on censored.TV that has since been removed from that website. His Twitter account was blocked after posting threatening comments about antifa, such as "We hunt them. Get their info. Expose them. Make them scared to be in public."

Biggs works as a talk radio host. He organized the End Domestic Terrorism rally in Portland, Oregon, in August 2019. Prior to the rally, Biggs posted memes about death squads murdering leftists, proclaimed "Death to Antifa!", and suggested a spiked weapon would "be put to good use,” before his Twitter account was suspended. In 2019, Biggs advocated for laws to ban protesters from wearing masks.

In March 2021, Biggs' lawyer, J. Daniel Hull, stated in a court filing that Biggs had acted as an FBI informant in 2019 and 2020, reporting on planned locations and routes for Proud Boys rallies as well as the activities by Antifa that he observed.

Participation in the 2021 Capitol Attack 

In the weeks before the 2021 storming of the United States Capitol, Biggs and other leading Proud Boys posted on Parler, calling on their followers to dress "incognito" on January 6, hoping to pass as antifa. "We are going to smell like you, move like you, and look like you. The only thing we’ll do that’s us is think like us!", he wrote, and "Jan 6th is gonna be epic". 

On January 6, Biggs and Proud Boys leader Ethan Nordean led a mob of Proud Boys members and supporters, as they marched near the Capitol. Biggs used a walkie-talkie to issue instructions, while Nordean used a bullhorn to communicate with the crowd. A Proud Boys livestreamer described the pair as "Two men on a mission, with about 500 behind them ready to kick some butt for the benefit of this country". Alongside Nordean and other Proud Boys, Biggs entered the Capitol, where he was seen on a number of video recordings and photographs; in one video, someone calls out Biggs' name and in response, he said, "This is awesome!"

In 2021, Biggs was arrested on charges arising from his participation in the Capitol attack. Three other Proud Boys leaders, including Nordean, were also charged. The charges against Biggs are "conspiracy, obstructing an official proceeding, obstruction of law enforcement during civil disorder, destruction of government property, entering and remaining in a restricted building and disorderly conduct in a restricted building." In the March 2021 indictment, federal prosecutors charged in the indictment with participating in the planning, preparation, and carrying out the insurrection, including fundraising for Proud Boys to travel to Washington; acquiring paramilitary and tactical gear and supplies; and using radio and encrypted messaging apps to coordinate the siege of the Capitol. The indictment says that the four Proud Boys leaders were among the first to forcibly breach the police lines and enter the Capitol, alongside the Oath Keepers. 

Biggs was initially granted pretrial release on condition of home confinement, but his bail (along with the bail for Nordean) was revoked after more serious charges were brought against them and new evidence emerged regarding their leading role in planning the attack on the Capitol. In ordering bail revoked, Judge Timothy J. Kelly said: "The defendants stand charged with seeking to steal one of the crown jewels of our country, in a sense, by interfering with the peaceful transfer of power. It's no exaggeration to say the rule of law and ... in the end, the existence of our constitutional republic is threatened by it." 
Biggs is held at the Seminole County Jail along with some other federal pretrial detainees.

Personal life 
Biggs's home is in Volusia County, Florida, in an unincorporated area near Ormond Beach, Florida.

References

People criminally charged for acts during the January 6 United States Capitol attack
Living people
Alt-right activists
American neo-fascists
American radio hosts
People from Florida
Prisoners and detainees of the United States federal government
Proud Boys
1983 births
United States Army personnel of the Iraq War
United States Army personnel of the War in Afghanistan (2001–2021)
American prisoners and detainees